Margny may refer to several communes in France:
 Margny, Ardennes
 Margny, Marne
 Margny-aux-Cerises, in the Oise department
 Margny-lès-Compiègne, in the Oise department
 Margny-sur-Matz, in the Oise department